Central Bedfordshire College (formerly Dunstable College, also known as CBC) is a British further education college located in Bedfordshire, England. The college was established in 1961 in Dunstable. On 14 January 2010, the college was renamed Central Bedfordshire College.  Ali Hadawi CBE, principal and chief executive explained that the change of name was to reflect the College's commitment to Central Bedfordshire as a whole and be recognised as the premier post sixteen institution in the area.

Today, the college has four campuses across Central Bedfordshire, in Dunstable, Houghton Regis, Luton and Leighton Buzzard. The college offers a range of courses, full-time and part-time, vocational and academic, from further education to higher education.

The college was a co-sponsor of UTC Central Bedfordshire, a university technical college which operated at the Houghton Regis campus of Central Bedfordshire College from 2012 until 2016.

Courses include:

Dunstable
Further education colleges in Bedfordshire
Education in Central Bedfordshire District
Educational institutions established in 1961
Educational institutions established in 2010
1961 establishments in England
2010 establishments in England